, called Fastest Finger First in English, is a Japanese manga series by Iqura Sugimoto. An anime television series adaptation by TMS Entertainment aired from July 4 to September 19, 2017.

Plot
The daily life of Shiki Koshiyama, as he joins the Quiz Bowl Circle club with his classmate Mari Fukami to partake in Quiz bowl matches during his freshman year in high school.

Characters

Sei Koshiyama

Media

Manga
It was serialized in Kadokawa Shoten's seinen manga magazine Young Ace from 2010 to 2020. Twenty tankōbon volumes were published.

Anime
An anime television series adaptation is produced by TMS Entertainment with Masaki Ōzora directing, Yuuko Kakihara supervised the anime's scripts and Makoto Takahoko drew the character designs. It aired from July 4 to September 19, 2017, on Nippon TV's AnichU programming block. The opening theme is "On My MiND" by Mrs. Green Apple and the ending theme is "◯◯◯◯◯" by Baby Raids Japan. The series ran for 12 episodes. Crunchyroll streamed the series.

Stage Play
The manga has inspired 2 live-action stage play adaptation with a third play to run in January 2021.

Notes

References

External links
 

2017 anime television series debuts
Anime series based on manga
Kadokawa Shoten manga
Kadokawa Dwango franchises
Manga adapted into television series
Nippon TV original programming
Seinen manga
TMS Entertainment